Fay (Fae) Brauer is Professor of Art and Visual Culture at the Centre for Cultural Studies Research, University of East London and Associate Professor of Art History, and Honorary Associate Professor in Art History and Cultural Theory at the University of New South Wales. Her books include Picturing Evolution and Extinction: Regeneration and Degeneration in Modern Visual Culture; Rivals and Conspirators: The Paris Salons and the Modern Art Centre; The Art of Evolution: Darwin, Darwinism and Visual Culture, and Art, Sex and Eugenics: Corpus Delecti. She is the author of many book chapters and journal articles investigating the interrelationship of art, visual culture, medicine and science, particularly in relation to the Anthropocene, the body, eugenics, genetics and alternative sciences such as "animal magnetism" and occultism. She has Honours Degrees from the University of London with an MA and PhD from The Courtauld Institute of Art, London.

References

External links
World Cat

Living people
Year of birth missing (living people)
Place of birth missing (living people)
Nationality missing
Academics of the University of East London
Academic staff of the University of New South Wales
Alumni of the University of London
Alumni of the Courtauld Institute of Art
British women non-fiction writers